The 2022 Lebanese Elite Cup was the 24th edition of the Lebanese Elite Cup. The competition included the six best teams from the 2021–22 Lebanese Premier League season. The first matchday was played on 27 July, one day before the start of the 2022 Lebanese Challenge Cup. Ahed won their sixth title after defeating Ansar 2–1 in the final on 20 August.

Group stage

Group A

Group B

Final stage

Semi-finals

Final

References

External links
 RSSSF

Lebanese Elite Cup seasons
Elite